Below is a list of the first Black players in Major League Baseball in chronological order.

The baseball color line excluded players of Black African descent from Major League Baseball and its affiliated Minor Leagues until 1947 (with a few notable exceptions in the 19th century before the line was firmly established).

Before 1885 at least three African-American men                                                                                                                    played in the major leagues: William Edward White, whose light skin color allowed him pass as white, played one game for the Providence Grays in 1879; Moses Fleetwood Walker, an openly Black man who played for the Toledo Blue Stockings of the American Association between May 1 and September 4, 1884; and his brother, Weldy Walker, who played five games with the Toledo club between July 15 and August 6, 1884. Baseball officials essentially drew the color line against Fleetwood Walker. African-Americans had been excluded from major league baseball since 1884 and from white professional minor league teams since 1889. Following the 1891 season, the Ansonia Cuban Giants, a team composed of African-American players, were expelled from the Connecticut State League, the last white minor league to have a Black team.

The Brooklyn Dodgers broke the 63-year color line when they started future Hall of Famer Jackie Robinson at first base on Opening Day, April 15, 1947. The Boston Red Sox were the last team to break the line, when they inserted Pumpsie Green as an eighth-inning pinch runner in a July 21, 1959 game at Chicago.

Before 1885

After 1946

Overall 

Below is a list of the first 20 Black players in Major League Baseball since Moses Fleetwood Walker's last major league appearance.

Note: Johnny Wright was the second Black player signed to a contract by the Dodgers, and was on the roster of the 1946 Montreal Royals at the same time as Jackie Robinson, but never played in the Major Leagues.

By team 

Teams are listed by franchise; i.e., teams that relocated to a new city after already breaking the color line are not listed a second time.
Expansion teams that joined the National and American Leagues after 1961 have been integrated from their first game and are not listed.

* Major League Baseball recognizes Curt Roberts as the Pirates' first Black player; however, Carlos Bernier of Puerto Rico, also a Black man, debuted on April 22, 1953.
‡ Thompson and Irvin broke in with the Giants during the same game on July 8, 1949. Thompson was the starting third baseman, and Irvin pinch hit in the eighth.

See also

History of baseball in the United States
Baseball color line#Professional baseball firsts
Negro league baseball
List of Negro league baseball players
List of first black players for European national football teams
List of starting black NFL quarterbacks

References

First black Major League Baseball players by team and date
Major League Baseball